Jim Marsh is an American football coach.  He served as the head football coach at West Virginia University Institute of Technology in Montgomery, West Virginia for one season, in 1990 season, compiling a record of 3–7.

References

Year of birth missing (living people)
Living people
West Virginia Tech Golden Bears football coaches